Potok (in older sources Farji Potok or Farjev Potok) is a settlement in the Municipality of Železniki in the Upper Carniola region of Slovenia.

Name
The name of the settlement, Potok, literally means 'creek, stream'. The older Slovene name, Farji Potok (literally, 'Parish Creek'), as well as the semantically equivalent German name Pfaffenbach, refers to land in the village that was owned by Saint Anthony's parish church in Železniki. The village lies at confluence of Šturm Creek (Šturmova grapa) with Matevžek Creek (Matevžkova grapa), where they create Parish Creek (Farji potok), a tributary of the Davča River.

References

External links

Potok at Geopedia

Populated places in the Municipality of Železniki